The 1999 UCI Track Cycling World Cup Classics is a multi race tournament over a season of track cycling. The season ran from 21 May 1999 to 6 September 1999. The World Cup is organised by the UCI.

Overall nations standings

Results

Men

Women

References
Round 1, Mexico City (Results archived on June 10, 2009)
Round 2, Frisco (Results archived on June 13, 2010)
Round 3, Valencia (Results archived on June 13, 2010)
Round 4, Fiorenzuola d'Arda (Results archived on June 9, 2010)
Round 5, Cali (Results archived on June 9, 2010)
Overall nations results (Archived on June 13, 2010)
Men's overall results (Archived on June 13, 2010)
Women's overall results (Archived on June 13, 2010)

World Cup Classics
UCI Track Cycling World Cup